The 22971/22972 Bandra - Patna Weekly Express is a superfast train of the Indian Railways, which runs between  of Mumbai and  of Patna, the capital of Bihar.

It is currently being operated with 22971/22972 train numbers on a weekly basis.

Service

The 22971/Bandra Terminus - Patna Weekly Express has an average speed of 55 km/hr and covers 1845 km in 33h 30m.

The 22972/Patna - Bandra Terminus Weekly Express has an average speed of 57 km/hr and covers 1845 km in 32h 25m.

Route and halts

The important halts of the train are:

Schedule

Coach composite

The train has standard LHB rakes with max speed of 110 kmph. The train consists of 22 coaches :

 1 AC II Tier
 2 AC III Tier
 14 Sleeper Coaches
 3 General
 2 End-on Generator

Traction

Both trains are hauled by an Electric Loco Shed, Vadodara based WAP-4 electric locomotive from Bandra to Itarsi. From Itarsi trains are hauled by a Diesel Loco Shed, Itarsi based WDP-4 or WDM-3A diesel locomotives uptil Patna and vice versa.

Rake Sharing

The train shares its rake with 22965/66 Bandra Terminus - Bhagat Ki Kothi Superfast Express

References

External links
Indian Railway Passenger reservation Enquiry
IRCTC Online Passenger Reservation System

Express trains in India
Transport in Patna
Rail transport in Gujarat
Rail transport in Bihar
Rail transport in Maharashtra
Rail transport in Madhya Pradesh
Railway services introduced in 2001
Transport in Mumbai
2001 establishments in India